Peachtree Road may refer to:

The northern end of Peachtree Street, the main street in Atlanta, Georgia
Peachtree Road (album), a 2004 album by Elton John
Peachtree Road (novel), a 1988 novel by Anne Rivers Siddons

See also
Peachtree Road Race, a 10-kilometer run held annually in Atlanta, Georgia on July 4, Independence Day